Sour is a town and commune in Mostaganem Province, Algeria. It is located in Aïn Tédelès District. According to the 1998 census, it has a population of 20,625.

References

Communes of Mostaganem Province